The men's 200 metres event at the 2005 Asian Athletics Championships was held in Incheon, South Korea on September 3–4.

Medalists

Results

Heats
Wind: Heat 1: 0.0 m/s, Heat 2: +0.1 m/s, Heat 3: +0.3 m/s

Final
Wind: +1.8 m/s

References
Results

2005 Asian Athletics Championships
200 metres at the Asian Athletics Championships